"I See Love" is a song by British DJ and record producer Jonas Blue, featuring vocals from Joe Jonas. It was released as a digital download on 29 June 2018 via Virgin EMI Records as the seventh single from Blue's compilation album released on 9 November 2018 Blue. The song features on the films Hotel Transylvania 3: Summer Vacation and The Queen's Corgi.

Background
Spring Aspers, Head of Sony Motion Pictures Music Group said "Jonas Blue is a world-renowned talent and we’re thrilled to have him be part of the family. His collaboration with Joe Jonas on 'I See Love' perfectly captures the summer, tropical vibe of our film and we’re excited for audiences to hear this song and join us on our epic summer adventure! We're also delighted for the chance to work with Joe Jonas not only for 'I See Love' but on our film. Joe joined the Hotel Transylvania family as the voice of Kraken, a loving blue sea creature that only wishes to sing and perform for everyone onboard the Legacy cruise ship, and we know audiences will fall in love with his character – and song – just like we did!".

Critical reception
Phil Knott from Billboard said "The song captures the feeling of being on summer vacation and follows the animated cast through various scenes that will be included in the film, hitting theaters July 13".

Official video
A clip in the movie for the song with the lyrics displayed in different places with cool effects to accompany the release of "I See Love" was first released onto YouTube on 29 June 2018 at a total length of two minutes and fifty-two seconds.

Track listing

Charts

Release history

References

 

2018 songs
2018 singles
Hotel Transylvania songs
Jonas Blue songs
Joe Jonas songs
Songs written by Jonas Blue
Songs written by Mr Hudson
Songs written by Louis Schoorl
Songs written by Mitch Allan